The Eastern Himalayan broadleaf forests is a temperate broadleaf forest ecoregion found in the middle elevations of the eastern Himalayas, including parts of Nepal, India, Bhutan and Myanmar. These forests have an outstanding richness of wildlife.

Setting
It extends from the Kali Gandaki River in Nepal across Sikkim and West Bengal in India, Bhutan, the Indian state of Arunachal Pradesh and neighboring Myanmar.

The temperate broadleaf forests transition into the Himalayan subtropical pine forests and the Himalayan subtropical broadleaf forests at lower elevations, and into the Eastern Himalayan subalpine conifer forests at higher elevations. This area receives over 2000 mm of rainfall per year, mostly falling from May to September during the monsoon.

Flora
The Eastern Himalayan broadleaf forests are diverse and species-rich, with a great diversity (of oaks and rhododendrons in particular) and many endemic species including plants of Indomalayan, Indochinese, Himalayan, Eastern Asiatic and even Gondwanan origin. 

The ecoregion has two broad forest types: evergreen and deciduous. Evergreen forests are characterized by oaks (Quercus spp.), chiefly Quercus lamellosa, together with Lithocarpus pachyphylla, Rhododendron arboreum, Rhododendron falconeri, Rhododendron thomsonii, Magnolia doltsopa, Magnolia cathcartii, Exbucklandia populnea, Symplocos cochinchinensis, Magnolia spp., Cinnamomum spp., and Machilus spp. The many rhododendron species include more than fifty in Sikkim and another sixty in Bhutan. 

In the deciduous forests meanwhile the predominant tree species are Himalayan maple (Acer campbellii), Juglans regia, Alnus nepalensis, Betula alnoides, Betula utilis, and Echinocarpus dasycarpus.

Finally in Eastern Nepal there are wetter areas dominated by a mixture of Magnolia campbellii, Acer campbellii and Osmanthus suavis along with Himalayan hazel (Corylus ferox).

Fauna
The forests are home to over 500 species of bird some of which migrate to the higher Himalayas in the hot summer. There are twelve near-endemic bird species as well as the strictly endemic rufous-throated wren-babbler. A number of bird species especially pheasant, tragopan and hornbill are easily threatened by changes to their habitat and those found here include the globally threatened rufous-necked hornbill (Aceros nipalensis), Sclater's monal (Lophophorus sclateri), white-bellied heron (Ardea insignis), Blyth's tragopan (Tragopan blythii) and Ward's trogon (Harpactes wardi).

There are four endemic or near-endemic mammals including Gee's golden langur (Trachypithecus geei) which is found north of the Brahmaputra River between the Sankosh and Manas Rivers. Other endemic mammals are Hodgson's giant flying squirrel (Petaurista magnificus), Namdapha flying squirrel (Biswamoyopterus biswasi) and Brahma white-bellied rat (Niviventer brahma), while endangered species found here include a population of Bengal tigers adapted to higher mountain slopes and having a high conservation priority. Other endangered species include takin (Budorcas taxicolor) and Himalayan serow (a subspecies of Capricornis sumatraensis) as well as the vulnerable Mandelli's mouse-eared bat (Myotis sicarius), Assam macaque (Macaca assamensis), stump-tailed macaque (Macaca arctoides), dhole (Cuon alpinus), back-striped weasel (Mustela strigidorsa), clouded leopard (Neofelis nebulosa), and Irrawaddy squirrel (Callosciurus pygerythrus). The area also includes patches of fir forest with a bamboo undergrowth that are home to the endangered red panda (Ailurus fulgens).

Conservation
Most of the forest is intact as these are steep inaccessible slopes, although the Quercus lanata forests of the lower elevations are vulnerable to clearance, while the upper slopes are liable to be used for livestock grazing, especially in more densely populated Nepal. Protected areas include Namdapha National Park and Mehao Wildlife Sanctuary in Arunachal Pradesh, Makalu Barun National Park in Nepal, and parts of Thrumshingla, Jigme Dorji, and Jigme Singye Wangchuck National Parks and Kulong Chu Wildlife Sanctuary in Bhutan. There are plans to create corridors of protection linking some of these areas in Bhutan and in India. The area around Namdapha National Park has been increasingly settled by Chakma refugees from Bangladesh. Another threat is the plan to build a dam on the Dihing River. One area of importance that is currently unprotected is Mount Phulchowki in the Kathmandu valley.

Protected areas
In 1997, 15 protected areas were identified in this ecoregion, with a combined area of approximately  that includes 7% of the ecoregion's area:
 Eaglenest Wildlife Sanctuary, Arunachal Pradesh (also extends into the Himalayan subtropical pine forests)
 Mouling National Park, Arunachal Pradesh (also extends into the Himalayan subtropical pine forests)
 Mehao Wildlife Sanctuary, Arunachal Pradesh (also extends into the Himalayan subtropical pine forests and Brahmaputra Valley semi-evergreen forests) (() 
 Royal Manas National Park, Bhutan (also extends into the Himalayan subtropical broadleaf forests)
 Shivapuri Nagarjun National Park, Nepal
 Makalu-Barun National Park, Nepal; also extends into the Eastern Himalayan subalpine conifer forests and Eastern Himalayan alpine shrub and meadows
 Neora Valley National Park, West Bengal
 Torsa Strict Nature Reserve, Bhutan; also extends into the Eastern Himalayan subalpine conifer forests and Eastern Himalayan alpine shrub and meadows
 Jigme Dorji National Park, Bhutan (also extends into the Eastern Himalayan subalpine conifer forests and Eastern Himalayan alpine shrub and meadows)
 Thrumshingla National Park, Bhutan (also extends into the Eastern Himalayan alpine shrub and meadows)
 Bumdeling Wildlife Sanctuary, Bhutan (also extends into the Eastern Himalayan subalpine conifer forests)
 Jigme Singye Wangchuck National Park, Bhutan (also extends into the Eastern Himalayan subalpine conifer forests and Eastern Himalayan alpine shrub and meadows)
 Namdapha National Park, Bhutan
 Kamlang Wildlife Sanctuary, Arunachal Pradesh
 Chayu Nature Reserve, Tibet (also extends into the Eastern Himalayan subalpine conifer forests)

See also
List of ecoregions in India

References

External links 
WWF: Map of ecoregions in Nepal, showing the Eastern Himalayan broadleaf forests

 
Temperate broadleaf and mixed forests
Ecoregions of the Himalayas
Himalayan forests
.
Ecoregions of Bhutan
Ecoregions of India
Ecoregions of Nepal
Forests of India
Ecoregions of Asia
Indomalayan ecoregions
Forests of Nepal